Agnicourt-et-Séchelles is a commune in the department of Aisne in the Hauts-de-France region of northern France.

Geography
Agnicourt-et-Séchelles is located some 60 km south-east of Saint-Quentin and 20 km south by south-east of Vervins. It consists of two parcels of land joined by a narrow neck with both portions straddling road D58 between Tavaux-et-Pontséricourt in the west and Chaourse in the east. The southern portion of the commune is traversed by the D946 road from Marle in the west to Montcornet in the south-east almost parallel to the D58. Road D59 links the two roads in the commune and also to the village. The hamlet of Moranzy is at the intersection of Highway D58 and D59 and the hamlet of Séchelles lies in the eastern portion of the commune on Highway D58. The rest of the commune is entirely farmland.

Neighbouring communes and villages

Administration

Mayors of Agnicourt-et-Séchelles

Population

Sites and monuments
Church of Saint-Médard at Agnicourt (12th century)

Chapel of Saint Agapit at Séchelles. In Séchelles, unlike most other villages in the area, the church does not overlook the area around it as space for housing was at a premium. The topology is different (flat and less rugged) so the mode of defence of the immediate vicinity of the building was different.

See also
Communes of the Aisne department

External links
Agnicourt-et-Séchelles on Géoportail, National Geographic Institute (IGN) website 
Agnicourt and Sechelles on the 1750 Cassini Map

References

Communes of Aisne